Anselm Gerhard (born 30 March 1958) is a German musicologist and opera scholar.

Life and career 
Born in Heidelberg, Gerhard attended schools in Kiel and Mannheim. His studies took place at the Johann Wolfgang Goethe University and the Technical University of Berlin with Carl Dahlhaus (master's degree examination in 1982). From 1982 to 1985, he was a scholarship holder of the Volkswagen Foundation in Parma and Paris, and in 1985, he received his doctorate at the Technical University of Berlin. From 1985 to 1992, Gerhard worked as a research assistant, and later as a university assistant, at the Musicology Department of the Westfälische Wilhelms-Universität (Habilitation 1992), from 1992 to 1994 he worked there as a university lecturer and was a German Research Foundation of the Deutsche Forschungsgemeinschaft.

Since October 1994, Gerhard has been a full professor of musicology and director of the Institute for Musicology at the University of Bern. In addition, he has been a visiting professor at the universities of Fribourg, Pavia (Facoltà di musicologia in Cremona), Geneva and at the École normale supérieure in Paris; he has held guest lectureships at Stanford University, the Heidelberg, Basel and Zurich as well as the Musikhochschule Luzern. In 2006, he declined the call to the professorship for theatre studies at the University of Bayreuth combined with the direction of the Forschungsinstitut für Musiktheater in Thurnau castle. In 2009, he was awarded the Dent Medal by the Royal Musical Association (London) "for outstanding contributions to musicology".

From 1997 until 2001, he was co-editor of the journal Musiktheorie, from 2001 to 2012, co-editor of the journal Schubert: Perspektiven, since 2002 he has been co-editor of the Schweizer Beiträge zur Musikforschung, since 2003 co-editor of the journal Verdi Forum. Journal of the American Institute for Verdi Studies. Since 2016, he has edited the newly founded journal Verdiperspektiven. From May 2015 to December 2019, he chaired the newly founded Walter Benjamin Kolleg at the University of Bern as president.

Gerhard's main research interests include 19th-century operas: with his book The Urbanisation of Opera, which is also available in English translation, he developed a perspective on the history of perception and mentality on French historical opera between Rossini and Meyerbeer as well as Verdi. His publications on Verdi are numerous, dealing not only with analytical questions but also with the social history of Italian opera and the composer's biography. His habilitation thesis London and Classicism in Music relates the emergence of the concept of instrumental music referring only to itself to the British aesthetic debate of the 18th century, thus highlighting the British root of the "idea of absolute music".

With a conference organised in Bern in 1996, the contributions to which appeared in print in 2000, Gerhard was among the first music historians to address the involvement of German musicology in the Nazi regime. In other contributions on the method and history of the discipline of musicology, he critically examined the habit of treating historical questions in the framework of national history.

Publications 
 Die Verstädterung der Oper. Paris und das Musiktheater des 19. Jahrhunderts. Metzler, Stuttgart/Weimar 1992, ; englisch: The Urbanization of Opera: Music Theater in Paris in the Nineteenth Century, translated by Mary Whittall. The University of Chicago Press, Chicago/London 1998.
 Musikwissenschaft – eine verspätete Disziplin? Die akademische Musikforschung in der ersten Hälfte des 20. Jahrhunderts zwischen Fortschrittsglauben und Modernitätsverweigerung. Edited by Anselm Gerhard. Metzler, Stuttgart 2000.
 Verdi-Handbuch. edited by Anselm Gerhard and Uwe Schweikert. Metzler, Stuttgart/Weimar 2001, 2. überarbeitete Auflage 2013.
 London und der Klassizismus in der Musik. Die Idee der „absoluten Musik“ und Muzio Clementis Klavierwerk. Metzler, Stuttgart/Weimar 2002.
 „Musizieren, Lieben – und Maulhalten!“ Albert Einsteins Beziehungen zur Musik. edited by Ivana Rentsch and Anselm Gerhard. Schwabe, Basel 2006.
 Giuseppe Verdi. Beck, München 2012.
 Antonio Ghislanzoni: Wie macht man eine italienische Oper? Italienisch/deutsch [L’arte di far libretti (1870)]. edited by Anselm Gerhard. (Taschenbücher zur Musikwissenschaft, 163). Noetzel, Wilhelmshaven 2014.

References

External links 
 Anselm Gerhard on WorldCat
 Notice biographique sur le site de l'association genevoise des amis de l'opéra et du ballet.
 

1958 births
Living people
Writers from Heidelberg
Academic staff of the University of Bern
20th-century German musicologists
21st-century German musicologists